Albina (ahl-BEE-nah) is a feminine given name from the Roman cognate Albinus, derived from the Latin albus, meaning "white" or "bright". There are masculine variants including Albin in Kosovo, Poland, Scandinavia, and Slovenia; and Aubin in France. In Estonia, France, Hungary, Poland, Slovakia, and Sweden. March 1 is Albina’s Name day. Albina is uncommon as a surname. People with the given name Albina include:

 Albina Akhatova (born 1976), Russian biathlete
 Albina Dzhanabaeva (born 1979), Kazakh-Russian singer, soloist of popular Ukrainian/Russian group VIA-GRA
 Albina Grčić (born 1999), Croatian singer
 Albina Guarnieri (born 1953), Canadian politician
 Albina du Boisrouvray (born 1941), French former journalist and film producer who has become a global philanthropist and social entrepreneur
 Albina Kamaletdinova (born 1969), Tajik Olympic archer
 Albina Kelmendi (born 1998), Albanian singer
 Albina Osipowich (1911-1964), American-Lithuanian two time Olympic Gold Medal winner
 Albina Shagimuratova (born 1979), Tatar-Russian operatic soprano

References

Ancient Roman names
Circassian feminine given names
Czech feminine given names
English feminine given names
Feminine given names
Irish feminine given names
Italian feminine given names
Latin feminine given names
Polish feminine given names
Scottish feminine given names
Slovene feminine given names
Swedish feminine given names